Hibana futilis is a species of ghost spider in the family Anyphaenidae. It is found in a range from the United States to Venezuela and Cuba.

References

External links

 

Anyphaenidae
Articles created by Qbugbot
Spiders described in 1898